The Tischtennis-Bundesliga (DTTL) is the top German professional table tennis league.

Champions

External links 

 History of the TT-Bundesliga

Table tennis competitions
Tab
Professional sports leagues in Germany